The World Vacation Tour was the second concert tour by American hard rock band Van Halen in support of their second studio album Van Halen II.

Background
The band began their first full headlining tour in Fresno on March 25, 1979. The band were performing in arenas throughout the United States, where they had performed previously as an opening act. The band was set to perform in Spokane on April 14, but had postponed their show to April 19 due to an illness from one of the band members. The tour was a financial success for the band, aside from the additional costs of having extra lighting and sound equipment. The band had also toured Europe for two weeks and Asia during this tour, playing to larger audiences than they previously had on their first tour. The tour concluded on October 7, 1979 with a performance at the Forum in Inglewood where Eddie and Alex lived.

Reception
Nelson George, a reviewer for the magazine Billboard, gave the performance in New York City on May 12, 1979 a positive review. He opened with the acknowledgement of a sold out young and dedicated crowd as well as recognizing the two studio albums released by the band having also achieved gold. He praised the usage of backlights and colored light combinations, stating that the show despite being in its frenzy was well choreographed and slick with the noting of Roth's energy on stage. However, he criticized the sound based on how Eddie and Michael were washing away the vocals of Roth with the buzzing of their cordless guitars.

Music critic Bob Ross from the St. Petersburg Times, had also gave the band's performance a positive review after attending the Lakeland show, opening with a headline that Van Halen was "irresistibly entertaining". He noted on the excitement from the audience that the band had generated from 6,000 fans. He praised the energy, enthusiasm and simplicity techniques. When talking about Eddie Van Halen, he noted him as interesting a lead guitarist, comparing him to many other rising guitarists from other band in the decade. Commenting on Eddie's abilities during the show, he said the feedback never faltered, and his performance was a reminder that great rock music is fun, super-tight and never pompous. Ross concluded his review, agreeing with bassist Michael Anthony that Van Halen shouldn't change the basic sound the band developed.

Posting his review in the Leader-Post, Mike McVean gave the Regina, Saskatchewan performance he attended a positive review, opening that the 5,750 euphoric fans in attendance weren't disappointed - which ranged from 12 to 18 year olds having compared them to being like cattle going to the slaughterhouse. He noted that the band had put on a "cranium-splitting show" which featured a minimum of definition and clarity of lyric and a maximum of energy throughout the performance, sticking to what the show was about as he cited: "heavy metal hard rock". He praised both the quality of Eddie Van Halen's guitar work and David Lee Roth's vocals, comparing them to being a Robert Plant-style presence but criticized that the guitar riffs and leaps were of much relevance stating that one brick does not make a wall of sound. Concert attendee Verna Mogk was very disappointed with McVean's review, stating that they did not feel like a cow being led to the slaughterhouse, and did not appreciate being referred to that way. They noted on the fantastic musical abilities of the band with evidence of the loud applause the audience gave to them, remarking that McVean should check with his family physician for migrane relief after his "cranium-splitting" comment, with hopes the band did not read the review he made, following an "excellent and entertaining show".

However, Ted Drozdowski from the Morning Record and Journal gave the New Haven performance a negative review, opening his review with stating the band was miserably poor in concert with the simple statement: "Van Halen stinks!" He stated that the band was very disorganized and immature with no sense of timing, featured a hate-inspired stage presence as well as noting on an ugly light show. Despite the stage show was he quoted as "sad", he stated that the band was nowhere near the quality and perfection of their studio recordings. He criticized that the band was trying to be a copy of Led Zeppelin, with the band's lack of intelligence preventing even a mediocre copy. Having noted on the various issues that the band members had, as well as Roth's performance, comparing him to a prancing fool who behaved like a headless chicken, he also referred to Eddie Van Halen's guitar playing, also accusing him of cheating to achieve his claim to fame. He concluded his review, stating it was a terrible performing band and a waste of the price on a concert ticket.

Setlist
"Light Up the Sky"
"Somebody Get Me a Doctor"
Alex Van Halen drum solo
"Runnin' with the Devil"
"Dance the Night Away"
"Beautiful Girls"
"On Fire"
Michael Anthony bass solo
"You're No Good"
"Jamie's Cryin'"
"Fools" (Intro) and "Feel Your Love Tonight"
"Outta Love Again"
"Ice Cream Man"
"Ain't Talkin' 'Bout Love"
Eddie Van Halen guitar solo, "Spanish Fly" and "Eruption"
"You Really Got Me"
Encore
"Bottoms Up!"
"Growth", "Atomic Punk"

Tour dates

Box office score data

Personnel
Eddie Van Halen – guitar and background vocals
David Lee Roth – lead vocals, acoustic guitar on "Ice Cream Man"
Michael Anthony – bass, backing vocals
Alex Van Halen – drums

References

Citations

General sources

Van Halen concert tours
1979 concert tours